Henry Hammill Fowler (September 5, 1908  January 3, 2000) was an American lawyer and politician. He served as the United States Secretary of the Treasury under President Lyndon B. Johnson.

Early life and career
Fowler was born in Roanoke, Virginia, on September 5, 1908. He was the son of Mack Johnson Fowler, a locomotive engineer, and his wife, the former Bertha (née Browning). Henry Fowler graduated from Jefferson High School in 1925 and went on to graduate from Roanoke College in 1929, where he joined Pi Kappa Phi, played many sports, and edited the college newspaper. He received his law degree from Yale Law School in 1932.

He worked briefly at Covington & Burling in Washington, D.C., then joined the legal staff of the Tennessee Valley Authority (TVA) in 1934. There he assisted in the preparation and successful conduct of the four-year litigation establishing the constitutionality of that program. By 1939, he had risen to Assistant General Counsel of the TVA and subsequently served as chief counsel of a subcommittee of the U.S. Senate Committee on Education and Labor.

On October 19, 1938, Fowler married Trudye Pamela Hathcote (1910–2008). They had one son and two daughters: Henry Hammill, Jr., Marianne Fowler Smith and Susan Fowler-Gallagher.

Fowler and his family sponsored a public policy program at Roanoke College that has brought guests such as Sandra Day O'Connor to speak to College students and members of the community.

Wartime role
From 1941 to 1944, he was an assistant general counsel of the Office of Production Management and afterward of the War Production Board. He then served in the United Kingdom and Germany in 1944 and 1945. He returned to private practice and in 1951 rejoined the government to work on the mobilization of troops during the Korean War. During this period he was an administrator of the National Production Authority, administrator of the Defense Production Administration, Director of the Office of Defense Mobilization and member of the National Security Council.

Post-war career
With the onset of the Eisenhower administration, Fowler returned to his private law practice and served on the Democratic Advisory Council, which helped outline party positions on many issues. Fowler served as a member of the Commission on Money and Credit from 1958 to 1961, and of the National Committee on Government Finance of the Brookings Institution from 1960 to 1961. He was a Trustee of Roanoke College and of the Funds in the Episcopal Diocese of Virginia.

He was served as the Under Secretary of the Treasury, from February 3, 1961, until April 10, 1964. He spent was the most of his time at Treasury working on passage of the administration's tax program, which included an $11.5 billion tax cut. He then he returned to private law practice as senior member of the Washington firm of Fowler, Leva, Hawes and Symington. When C. Douglas Dillon resigned, Fowler served as Secretary of the Treasury from April 1, 1965, to December 20, 1968, Fowler was known for his loyalty to Johnson throughout the administration's ups and downs. He was described as having "a ruddy face, southern charm and a conservative outlook".

The major problems facing Fowler were inflation and the balance of payments deficit. In August 1967, Fowler began the fight for a 10 percent tax surcharge and saw the proposal passed by a House–Senate conference in June 1968. In the debate over the balance of payments deficit, Fowler was a proponent of the "go-slow" approach. Fowler organized a two-tier system for gold in 1968, and participated in the 1967–68 international agreements, which created a new international monetary reserve system called "special drawing rights".  He proposed (1967) a seminar (taken up by then Chancellor of the Exchequer James Callaghan) of financial officials from rich countries, the forerunner of the Group of Five. He also ended silver coinage in the United States.

After leaving the Treasury Department, Fowler became a partner with Goldman Sachs in New York City, New York.

Death

Fowler died of pneumonia in Alexandria, Virginia, on January 3, 2000. He was buried in Christ Church Cemetery in Alexandria. His wife died at age 97 on January 22, 2008, in her Alexandria home.

Notes

External links 
 Time magazine cover: Henry H. Fowler, September 10, 1965
 Roanoke College: Henry H. Fowler Public Policy Program
 
 
 A collection of works from Henry Fowler

|-

1908 births
2000 deaths
20th-century American politicians
Burials at Old Christ Church Episcopal Cemetery (Alexandria, Virginia)
Deaths from pneumonia in Virginia
Employees of the United States Senate
Goldman Sachs people
Lyndon B. Johnson administration cabinet members
Politicians from Roanoke, Virginia
Roanoke College alumni
Truman administration personnel
United States National Security Council staffers
United States Secretaries of the Treasury
Yale Law School alumni